José de Santa Rita Durão (1722–1784), known simply as Santa Rita Durão, was a Colonial Brazilian Neoclassic poet, orator and Augustinian friar. He is considered a forerunner of "Indianism" in Brazilian literature, with his epic poem Caramuru.

He is the correspondent patron of the 9th chair of the Brazilian Academy of Letters.

Life
José de Santa Rita Durão was born in Mariana, in what is now the Brazilian state of Minas Gerais, in 1722. For 10 years he studied at the Jesuit College of Rio de Janeiro and, one year later, he went to Europe, where he became an Augustinian priest. He graduated in Philosophy and Theology at the University of Coimbra, where he would occupy a Theology chair.

During the government of the Marquis of Pombal, he was persecuted and fled from Portugal. After being imprisoned in Spain as a spy, he went to Rome, where he worked as a librarian for 20 years, also travelling to Spain and France.

After the Pombaline government fell, he returned to Portugal, and delivered the opening address at the university of Coimbra for the year 1777. Soon afterwards, he retired to the cloisters of a convent. There he wrote his masterpiece and only known work: the Camões-influenced epic poem Caramuru, published in 1781 and based on the life of the famous Portuguese sailor Diogo Álvares Correia (a.k.a. "Caramuru" – Old Tupí for "Son of the Thunder"). Legend says Durão was a very prolific writer, and wrote many poems during his lifetime. However, Caramuru received lackluster reviews by the intellectuals of the time, and Durão, heart-broken, destroyed all his poems and other literary works.

He died in Lisbon in 1784.

References

1722 births
1784 deaths
18th-century Brazilian poets
18th-century Brazilian Roman Catholic priests
People from Minas Gerais
University of Coimbra alumni
Brazilian people of Portuguese descent
Brazilian male poets
Colonial Brazil
Patrons of the Brazilian Academy of Letters
18th-century male writers